This is a list of recordings of Kathleen Battle (born 13 August 1948), an African-American operatic soprano. The list includes live and studio recordings available in audio CD, VHS and DVD. Five of the recordings listed here won Grammy Awards:
Best Classical Vocal Soloist Performance for Kathleen Battle Sings Mozart, 1986
Best Classical Vocal Soloist Performance for Salzburg Recital, 1987
Best Opera Recording for Richard Strauss: Ariadne Auf Naxos, 1987
Best Classical Vocal Soloist Performance for Kathleen Battle at Carnegie Hall (Handel, Mozart, Liszt, Strauss, etc.), 1992
Best Opera Recording for Handel: Semele, 1993

Discography

Choral and symphonic

Complete operas

Recitals, concerts, aria and song collections

Soundtracks

Notes and references

 Richard Dyer, Elizabeth Forbes: "Kathleen Battle", Grove Music Online ed. L. Macy (Accessed September 21, 2008), (subscription access)

External links
Kathleen Battle at Columbia Artists Management

Opera singer discographies
Discographies of American artists